This is a list of universities in the United States classified as research universities in the Carnegie Classification of Institutions of Higher Education. Research institutions are a subset of doctoral degree-granting institutions and conduct research. These institutions "conferred at least 20 research/scholarship doctorates in 2019-20 and reported at least $5 million in total research expenditures in FY20 were assigned to one of two categories based on a measure of research activity."

History 
The 1994 edition of the Carnegie Classification defined Research I universities as those that:

 Offer a full range of baccalaureate programs
 Are committed to graduate education through the doctorate
 Give high priority to research
 Award 50 or more doctoral degrees each year
 Receive annually $40 million or more in federal support

The Carnegie Foundation reported that 59 institutions met these criteria in 1994.

In their interim 2000 edition of the classification, the Carnegie Foundation renamed the category to Doctoral/research universities-extensive in order to avoid the inference that the categories signify quality differences." The foundation replaced their single classification system with a multiple classification system in their 2005 comprehensive overhaul of the classification framework  so that the term "Research I university" was no longer valid, though many universities continued to use it.

In 2015, the Carnegie Classification System reinstated the "Research I university" designations along with "Research II" and "Research III."  The current system, introduced in 2018, includes the following three categories for doctoral universities:

 R1: Doctoral Universities – Very high research activity
 R2: Doctoral Universities – High research activity
 D/PU: Doctoral/Professional Universities

In the 2018 classification, institutions were classified as either R1 or R2 if they "conferred at least 20 research/scholarship doctorates in 2016-17 and reported at least $5 million in total research expenditures." A "research activity index" was then calculated that included the following measures:

 Research & development (R&D) expenditures in science and engineering (S&E)
 R&D expenditures in non-S&E fields
 S&E research staff (postdoctoral appointees and other non-faculty research staff with doctorates)
 Doctoral conferrals in humanities, social science, STEM (science, technology, engineering, and mathematics) fields, and in other fields (e.g., business, education, public policy, social work)

These four measures were combined using principal component analysis to create two indices of research activity, one representing an aggregate level of research activity and the other representing per-capita research activity.  Institutions that were high on both indices were classified among "R1: Doctoral Universities – Very high research activity."

Universities classified as "R1: Doctoral Universities – Very high research activity" 
There are 146 institutions that are classified as "R1: Doctoral Universities – Very high research activity" in the Carnegie Classification of Institutions of Higher Education as of the 2021 update.

These universities have a very high level of both research activity and per capita in such research activity, using aggregate data to determine both measurements. In other words, these institutions provide a lot of resources for research and have a lot of people conducting research at their respective institution. These two classifications can be seen as the aggregate supply and demand for research, respectively. 

Among the 50 U.S. states and the national capital of Washington, D.C., only five states do not have an R1 level university: Alaska, Idaho, South Dakota, Vermont, and Wyoming.

Map of institutions

Universities classified as "R2: Doctoral Universities – High research activity" 
There are 133 institutions that are classified as "R2: Doctoral Universities – High research activity" in the Carnegie Classification of Institutions of Higher Education as of the 2021 update.

These universities have a very high level of either research activity or per capita in such research activity, using aggregate data to determine both measurements, while having a very low level on the other qualification. In other words, these institutions either lack research facilities or do not have a lot of people conducting research at their respective institution. These two classifications can be seen as the aggregate supply and demand for research, respectively.

Map of institutions

Universities classified as "Special Focus - Research Institutions"
There are 23 institutions that are classified as "Special Focus - Research Institutions" in the Carnegie Classification of Institutions of Higher Education as of the 2021 update.

This new category has the same threshold for inclusion as R1 and R2 schools do (At least twenty research doctorates awarded and five million dollars in research expenditures), but unlike R1 and R2 schools, they only award degrees in a single academic area.

Map of institutions

See also 

 Association of American Universities
 Research university

References

External links 
 Carnegie Classification of Institutions of Higher Education
 The Top American Research Universities – Annual report by the Center for Measuring University Performance at Arizona State University

Research universities
Research universities

United States Universities